Huế station is a railway station in the city of Huế, Vietnam on the main North–South railway. The street address is 2 Bui Thi Xuan Street, Huế, Thừa Thiên–Huế Province, Vietnam.

The station was built by the French colonial authorities during the French Indochina period. The station is influenced by French architecture and is today considered one of the most beautiful railway stations in Vietnam. Built by the French Public Works Department, it was considered a "rectangular horror" according to a source from 1913. During the Vietnam War in the Battle of Hue the station housed snipers but U.S. troops drove them out.

References

Buildings and structures in Huế
Railway stations in Vietnam